The 2021–22 Sarajevo season was the club's 73rd season in existence, and their 28th consecutive season in the top flight of Bosnian football, the Premier League of BiH. Besides competing in the Premier League, the team also competed in the National Cup. Sarajevo competed in the qualifications for the UEFA Europa Conference League as well.

Squad information

First-team squad

(C)

(3rd captain)

 (C)

(4th captain)

Transfers

Transfers in

Transfers out

Loans out

Loans in

Kit

Friendlies

Pre-season

Mid-season

Competitions

Overview

Premier League

League table

Results summary

Results by round

Matches

Cup of Bosnia and Herzegovina

Round of 32

Round of 16

Quarter-finals

Semi-finals

Final

UEFA Europa Conference League

Sarajevo entered the UEFA Europa Conference League at the first qualifying round.

First qualifying round

Statistics

Squad appearances and goals

|-
! colspan="14" style="background:#dcdcdc; text-align:center"|Goalkeepers

|-
!colspan="14" style="background:#dcdcdc; text-align:center"|Defenders

|-
!colspan="14" style="background:#dcdcdc; text-align:center"|Midfielders

|-
!colspan="14" style="background:#dcdcdc; text-align:center"|Forwards

|-
! colspan=14 style=background:#dcdcdc; text-align:center|Players who have made an appearance this season but have left the club

|}
Number after the "+" sign represents the number of games player started the game on the bench and was substituted on.

Disciplinary record
Includes all competitive matches and only players that got booked throughout the season. The list is sorted by shirt number, and then position.

Goalscorers

Assists

Clean sheets

References

External links

FK Sarajevo seasons
Sarajevo
Sarajevo